George Corbyn "Doc" Shepherd (13 May 1900 – October 1986) was a British racing driver. He entered the inaugural year of the British Saloon Car Championship in 1958, driving a class A Austin A35 where he finished fourth on points and second in class. in 1959, he finished second in the championship in an Austin A40. He became the BSCC champion a year later in 1960 for the Don Moore Racing Team.

Racing record

Complete British Saloon Car Championship results
(key) (Races in bold indicate pole position; races in italics indicate fastest lap.)

† Events with 2 races staged for the different classes.

‡ Event with 3 races staged for the different classes.

References

 BTCC Pages list of champions.

English racing drivers
British Touring Car Championship drivers
British Touring Car Championship Champions
Living people
Year of birth missing (living people)
Place of birth missing (living people)